Elbasan railway station serves the city of Elbasan, Albania.

The station was opened in 1950. At opening, it was the terminus of an extension from Peqin. It remained the terminus until March 1974, when an extension to Përrenjas was completed.

The line beyond Elbasan, which runs through extremely sparsely populated regions of the country, was closed in 2012 and Elbasan again became a terminus. Plans have existed since the late 2000s to build a new line to Elbasan from the capital Tirana to allow more direct movement between the two cities and replace the circuitous route which currently exists.

References

External links
 New line Tirana-Elbasan

Railway stations in Albania
Railway stations opened in 1950
1950 establishments in Albania